Teluk Datok is the administrative capital of Kuala Langat District, Selangor, Malaysia. The suburb is administered by the Zone 14 of the Kuala Langat Municipal Council along with the future administration centre of Kota Seri Langat.

An architectural feature of Telok Datuk is the old colonial Police Station, which has been refurnished and now houses the local Giat MARA facility.

Kuala Langat District
Towns in Selangor